The ATLAS of Finite Groups, often simply known as the ATLAS, is a group theory book by John Horton Conway, Robert Turner Curtis, Simon Phillips Norton, Richard Alan Parker and Robert Arnott Wilson (with computational assistance from J. G. Thackray), published in December 1985 by Oxford University Press and reprinted with corrections in 2003.  It lists basic information about 93 finite simple groups, the information being generally: its order, Schur multiplier, outer automorphism group, various constructions (such as presentations), conjugacy classes of maximal subgroups (with characters group action they define), and, most importantly, character tables (including power maps on the conjugacy classes) of the group itself and bicyclic extensions given by stem extensions and automorphism groups.  In certain cases (such as for the Chevalley groups ), the character table is not listed and only basic information is given.

The ATLAS is a recognizable large format book (sized 420mm by 300mm) with a cherry red cardboard cover and spiral binding. The names of the authors, all six letters long, with initials for the first and second letter, are printed on the cover in the form of an array which evokes the idea of a character table.

The ATLAS is being continued in the form of an electronic database, the ATLAS of Finite Group Representations.

Finite groups
Mathematics books
John Horton Conway